Tyler Hoover may refer to:
 Tyler Hoover, host of the YouTube channel Hoovie's Garage
 Tyler Hoover (American football), American football player